Murdock Township may refer to the following townships in the United States:

 Murdock Township, Douglas County, Illinois
 Murdock Township, Butler County, Kansas